This is a list of weapons used by the Swedish Army.

Armoured and other vehicles

Artillery

Air defence systems

Small arms

Anti-armour

Logistical vehicles 
 MAN TG-MIL 8x8 hook lift
 RMMV HX range of tactical trucks
 Scania PRT-range
 Scania P124 6x6 hook lift
 Scania P124 8x8 protected, hook lift
 Scania SBA111
 Volvo FMX
 Volvo FM12 6x6 hook lift

Former equipment

Armour 
 (1921–1939) Stridsvagn m/21-29 light tank (Strv m/21-29) – 10
 (1933–1980s) Landsverk L-180 armoured car (L180) in versions: – 5 total
 L-180 – 5
 L-181
 L-182
 (1934–????) Stridsvagn L-60 light tank (Strv L-60) in versions: – 180 total
 L-60A
 L-60B
 L-60C
 L-60D
 (1937–1940) Landsverk L-120 light tank (L120) – 1
 (1938–1953) Stridsvagn m/37 tankette (Strv m/37) – 48
 (1938–1956) Pansarbil m/39 armoured car (Lynx) – 15
 (1941–1950s) Stridsvagn m/41 medium tank (Strv m/41) – 138
 (1941–1950s) Stridsvagn m/42 medium tank (Strv m/42) in versions: – 342 total
 Stridsvagn m/42 TM (Lago II)
 Stridsvagn m/42 TH (Lago III)
 Stridsvagn m/42 EH (Lago IV)
 Stridsvagn m/42 TV
 (1944-1973) Stormartillerivagn m/43 assault gun Sav m/43 – 36
 (1953–2000) Stridsvagn 81 main battle tank (Centurion) in versions: – 350 total
 Bärgningsbandvagn 81
 Stridsvagn 81
 Stridsvagn 101
 Stridsvagn 101R
 Stridsvagn 102
 Stridsvagn 102R
 Stridsvagn 104
 Stridsvagn 105
 Stridsvagn 106
 (1958–1984) Stridsvagn 74 main battle tank (Strv 74) in versions: – 235 total
 Stridsvagn 74 H
 Stridsvagn 74 V
 (1961–1971) Pansarbandvagn 301 armoured personnel carrier (Pbv 301) in versions: – 185 total
 Pansarbandvagn 301
 Stridsledningspansarbandvagn 3011
 Eldledningspansarbandvagn 3012
 (1966-2014) Pansarbandvagn 302 Armoured personnel carrier (Pbv 302) in versions: - 647 total
 Pansarbandvagn 302
 Stridsledningspansarbandvagn 3021
 Eldledningspansarbandvagn 3022
 Batteriplatspansarbandvagn 3023
 Radiolänkpansarbandvagn 3024
 Sjuktransportpansarbandvagn 3026
 Stridsledningspansarbandvagn 3021B
 Stridsledningspansarbandvagn 3021C
 Eldledningspansarbandvagn 3022C
 Batteriplatspansarbandvagn 3023C
 Radiolänkpansarbandvagn 3024C
 Pjäsrekognoseringspansarbandvagn 3025C
 (1967–1997) Stridsvagn 103 main battle tank (Strv 103) in versions: – 290 total
 Stridsvagn 103A
 Stridsvagn 103B
 Stridsvagn 103C
 Stridsvagn 103D
 (1976–2002) Infanterikanonvagn 91 tank destroyer (Ikv 91) – 212
 (1993-2011) Panserbandvagn 401 amoured personnel carrier (MT-LB) - 1016
 (1995–2008) Pansarbandvagn 501 infantry fighting vehicle (BMP-1) – 350

Small arms 
 (1870–????) Kjellman machine gun (Kjellman LMG)
 (1894–1925) Swedish Mauser bolt-action rifle (gevär m/96) in versions:
 m/94 (model 1894)
 m/96 (model 1896)
 m/38 (model 1938)
 m/41 (model 1941)
 (1918–1940s) MP 18.1 submachine gun (MP 18)
 (1935–1945) Maskinpistol 35 submachine gun (M39)
 (1939–????) Karabiner 98k bolt-action rifle (Karbin M40)
 (1939–1980s) Hispano-Suiza-MP43/44 submachine gun (Suomi KP/-31)
 (????–1945) Schwarzlose MG M.07/12 (kulspruta m/14)
 (1940–1990s) Lahti L-35 semi-automatic pistol (Pistol m/40)
 (1940–????) Kg m/40 light machine gun (KG/1940)
 (1942–1960s) Automatgevär m/42 semi-automatic rifle (Ag m/42)
 (1942-1980s) Kulspruta m/42 machine gun (Ksp m/42)
 (1942–1957) Raketgevär 46 recoilless anti-tank weapon (bazooka)
 (1945–2003) Carl Gustav Kulsprutepistol M/45 submachine gun (Kpist m/45)
 (1968–1986) Miniman anti-tank weapon (Pansarskott m/68)
 (1945–2007) Carl Gustav M/45 submachine gun
 kpist m/45
 kpist m/45B
 kpist m/45C

Fire support/artillery 
 (1927–1945) 10.5 cm kanon modell 1927 heavy field gun (cannon model 1927)
 (1934–????) Bofors 75 mm Model 1934 mountain gun (Bofors 75 mm)
 (1935–????) 10.5 cm kanon m/34 heavy field gun (kanon m/34)
 (1940–????) 10.5 cm Haubits m/40 howitzer (Haubits m/40) – 540+ total
 (1940–????) Bofors 37 mm anti-tank gun (Bofors 37 mm)
 (1941–1966) Luftvärnskanonvagn L-62 Anti II self-propelled anti-aircraft gun (L-62) – 6 total
 (1967–2003) Bandkanon 1 self-propelled artillery (Bkan 1) in versions: – 26 total
 Bandkanon 1 A
 Bandkanon 1 C
 (1978–2011) 15.5 cm Haubits 77 heavy gun-howitzer (Haubits FH77) - 220 total
 15.5 cm Haubits 77 A
 15.5 cm Haubits 77 B

References 

Swedish Army
Swedish military-related lists
Swedish Army
Military equipment of Sweden